Nikola Ivanov Lazarov (1 April 1870 – 14 June 1942) was a Bulgarian architect.

Lazarov was born in the sub-Balkan town of Karlovo, then part of the Ottoman Empire (today in central Bulgaria). His father, a rose oil and woolen braid dealer and manufacturer, was killed by the Ottomans during the Russo-Turkish War of 1877–1878 which led to the Liberation of Bulgaria. Left an orphan, Lazarov moved to the capital Sofia, where he worked as a draftsman at the Capital Direction of Public Buildings under Friedrich Grünanger, Aleksi Nachev, Mihail Hashnov and Karl Heinrich. Lazarov received a Bulgarian state scholarship to study at the École Spéciale d'Architecture in Paris, France. He finished two years at the school only to return to Bulgaria due to a lack of funds. However, on the recommendation of several noted architects he was granted another scholarship, this time by the Prince of Bulgaria himself, and returned to Paris. He graduated from the École Spéciale d'Architecture in 1893 with a thesis on the main church of the Rila Monastery.

Upon his graduation Nikola Lazarov returned to Sofia. As a royal scholarship student, he was obliged to work for three years as a royal architect. During that period he participated in the construction of the northeast wing of the Sofia Royal Palace and the final interior works on the Euxinograd palace in Varna. He also finished the exterior and interior design of the Central Military Club in Sofia, which was only roughly constructed under Antonín Kolář.

In 1896, he established the first private architectural company (headquartered at Targovska Street), and in 1902 he became the first architect to be elected to the National Assembly of Bulgaria by joining the parliament as a deputy of his native Karlovo. Together with Yordan Milanov, he attended the 8th International Congress of Architects in Vienna in 1908. He worked actively as an architect until 1934. In 1937–1941, he was a leading member of the Capital Municipal Council and an advocate of Adolf Mussmann's 1938 city plan.

Works
 Vrana Palace main building, Sofia; co-operation on the Sofia Royal Palace and Euxinograd palace
 Parushevi Brothers' twin houses at Oborishte Street, Sofia
 Baron Gendovich House, Sofia
 Sofia Court House (initial project, later redesigned by Pencho Koychev)
 Central Military Club, Sofia (initial project by Antonín Kolář); military clubs in Shumen, Plovdiv and Varna
 Stoyan Bachvarov Dramatic Theatre, Varna
 Public Baths in Pleven

Gallery

References

Bulgarian architects
Bulgarian politicians
People from Karlovo
1870 births
1942 deaths
École Spéciale d'Architecture alumni